Yvon Éthier better known as Patrick Norman  (born September 10, 1946) is a Canadian country musician. He sings both in French and English and has had hits in Quebec and in the rest of Canada.

In 1970, Norman's single "Love is All" appeared on the RPM Top 50 Canadian Chart.

His song, "Let's Try Once More",  was nominated for a 1978 Juno Award in the Juno Award for Single of the Year category. He was nominated for Juno Award for Country Recording of the Year at the 1989 Juno Award.

Awards and nominations
Juno Awards
1978: Nomination for "Best Selling Single" for "Let's Try Once More"
Félix Awards (ADISQ Gala)
1982: Nomination for "Best Album - Western" 
1985: Nomination for "Best Album - Country-western"
1987: Winner of "Best Male Singer"
1987: Winner of "Best Selling Album of the Year" for Quand on est en amour
1988: Nomination for "Best English Album - pop-rock"
1989: Winner for "Best Album - Country" for Soyons heureux
1991: Nomination for "Best Album - Pop"
1993: Nomination for "Best Album - Pop"
1994: Nomination for "Best Artiste - Language other than French"
1997: Nomination for "Best Album - Instrumental"
1998: Nomination for "Best Live Act" 
2001: Nomination for "Best Albukm - Contemporary Folk"
2002: Nomination for "Best Album - Pop"
2005: Nomination for "Best Live Act"
2007: Nomination for "Best DVD" 
2007: Receiver of "Félix Hommage" (Life Achievement tribute award)
Metrostar
1986: Winner of "Best Song of the Year" for "Quand on est en amour"
1986: Winner of "Best Singer"
1987: Winner of "Best Singer"
Artis Award
1988: Artis trophy for "Best Song of the Year" for "Quand on est en amour"
SOCAN
2012: Award for Excellence
2012: Lifetime Achievement Award

Discography

Albums
1972: Patrick Norman
1974: Toi qui rêves
1976: Textures
1978: Sweet Sweet Lady
1980: On part au soleil
1982: Hommage à Kenny Rogers
1984: Quand on est amour
1987: 12 grands succès (compilation)
1987: Only Love Sets You Free
1988: Soyons heureux
1990: Passion vaudou
1992: Noël sans faim
1994: The Christmas Album
1994: Whispering Shadows
1995: Chez-moi
1996: Les grands succès (compilation)
1997: Guitare
1997: Collection privée
1998: Country (joint album with Renée Martel)
1998: Un joyeux Noël tout en chansons (compilation)
1999: 10 grands succès (compilation)
2000: Patrick Norman
2001: Les plus belles chansons de mariage
2002/2003: Soirée intime
2004: Simplement Patrick Norman
2007: Tu peux frapper à ma porte
2007: Comment le dire..."
2008: Les plus belles voix country de chez-nous (compilation jointly with Richard Huet and André Breton)
2008: Plaisirs de Noël2010: Where I Come From2011: L'amour n'a pas d'addresse2016: Nous (with Renée Martel)

Singles
1966: Je pleure sous la pluie / Tu me reviendras, Cindy
1970: Notre amour / Que le temps s'arrête
1970: Pour un instant d'amour / Donne-moi ton cœur
1971: Je serai toujours ton ami / Instrumental
1972: On a toujours besoin d’amour / Je ne comprends rien
1972: Pour un instant d’amour / Laisse-moi rêver
1972: Mon cœur est à toi / Donne-moi ton cœur
1973: Mon cœur est à toi / On a toujours besoin d’amour
1973: D’où que tu viennes / Il n'y a que toi
1974: Quand tu me reviens / Toi qui rêves
1974: Free as the Wind / Welcome to My World
1974: Papillon / Toi qui rêves
1974: Papillon / Free As The Wind
1974: Papillon / Mon pays
1974: Salut les amis / Quand le blé sera levé
1974: Love Is All / That's Part of Being Your Man
1975: Tu n’es plus là / Tout comme avant
1976: C'est la saison / Hello Mom
1976: You've Lost That Loving Feeling / Baby You Can Count On Me
1977: Let's Try Once Again / Instrumental (with the Black Light Orchestra)
1977: Loving You / Instrumental
1978: I Remember You / Sweet, Sweet Lady
1978: Paradise / Bring Back The Love
1978: L'amour de ma vie / La mélodie du printemps
1979: Je n'ai jamais aimé comme je t’aime / Vieillir ensemble
1979: Aiko Aiko / Que vais-je devenir
1980: Avant toi / On part au soleil
1980: Mon vieux copain / Je serai toujours là
1982: Lady / Amants de la nuit
1982: Crois en l’amour / T'es sûrement fatigué
1983: Mais tu sais je t'aime / Qui est gagnant
1983: C'est pour toi que je chante / Instrumental
1984: Quand on est en amour
1984: Nous (with Renée Martel) / Instrumental
1985: Rêves fous / L'hirondelle
1985: Toi le soleil de ma vie / Vivre
1986: Quand on est en amour / L'amour ensemble
1987: Vivre
1987: Only Love Sets You Free / Instrumental
1987: L'amour ensemble / Instrumental
1987: True Love Will Find A Way / Instrumental
1988: Tu n'es plus là
1988: Two Shades Of Roses / Love's A Crazy Game
1988: J'ai besoin de toi
1988: I'd Rather Have You
1989: J'ai oublié de vivre
1989: Il pleut à mourir (with Marie-France Laurin)
1989: Heaven In Her Eyes
1989: Perce les nuages
1990: Elle s'en va

Filmography
1985: South Bronx Heroes as William Szarka
2006: La véritable histoire du petit chaperon rouge'' - voice over

References

External links
 Patrick Norman at The Canadian Encyclopedia
Quebec Info Musique - Patrick Norman

1946 births
Living people
Canadian country singer-songwriters
Canadian male singers
French-language singers of Canada
French Quebecers
Members of the Order of Canada
Singers from Montreal
Félix Award winners
Canadian male singer-songwriters
Celebration (record label) artists